This is a list of Greek football transfers in the 2017 summer transfer window by club. Only clubs in the 2017–18 Superleague Greece are included.

Superleague Greece

AEK Athens

In:

Out:

Apollon Smyrni

In:

Out:

Asteras Tripoli

In:

Out:

Atromitos

In:

Out:

Kerkyra

In:

Out:

Lamia

In:

Out:

Larissa  

In:

Out:

Levadiakos

In:

Out:

Olympiacos

In:

Out:

Panathinaikos

In:

Out:

Panetolikos

In:

Out:

Panionios

In:

Out:

PAOK

In:

Out:

PAS Giannina

In:

Out:

Platanias

In:

Out:

Xanthi

In:

Out:

References

Transfers
2017
Greece